The Santiago Chile Temple is the 26th constructed and 24th operating temple of the Church of Jesus Christ of Latter-day Saints (LDS Church). Located in the Chilean capital, Santiago, it was built with a modern single-spire design.

History
The LDS Church temple in Santiago was announced on April 2, 1980, and dedicated on September 15, 1983 by Gordon B. Hinckley. The Apia Samoa, Nuku'alofa Tonga, and Sydney Australia temples all have the same design. The temple underwent remodeling and was then rededicated by Hinckley on March 12, 2006.

The Santiago Chile Temple was the first LDS temple to be built on Spanish-speaking soil and the second to be built in South America.

Since its initial construction, there have been additions to the temple property including housing for patrons who come from the far reaches of Chile to stay in while they attend the temple.

In 2020, the Santiago Chile Temple was closed temporarily during the year in response to the coronavirus pandemic.

Temple presidents
Notable presidents of the temple include Eduardo Ayala (1995–98) and Robert E. Wells (1998–2001).

See also

 Comparison of temples of The Church of Jesus Christ of Latter-day Saints
 List of temples of The Church of Jesus Christ of Latter-day Saints
 List of temples of The Church of Jesus Christ of Latter-day Saints by geographic region
 Temple architecture (Latter-day Saints)
 The Church of Jesus Christ of Latter-day Saints in Chile

References

External links

Santiago Chile Temple Official site
Santiago Chile Temple at ChurchofJesusChristTemples.org
 Santiago Chile Temple page with interior photos

1983 establishments in Chile
20th-century Latter Day Saint temples
Buildings and structures in Santiago
Religious buildings and structures completed in 1983
Temples (LDS Church) in Latin America
Temples (LDS Church) in Chile
The Church of Jesus Christ of Latter-day Saints in Chile